Christine E. Sleeter (born 1948) is an American professor and educational reformer. She is known as the Professor Emerita in the School of Professional Studies, California State University, Monterey Bay. She has also served as the Vice President of Division K (Teaching and Teacher Education) of the American Educational Research Association, and as president of the National Association for Multicultural Education. Her work primarily focuses on multicultural education, preparation of teachers for culturally diverse schools, and anti-racism. She has been honored for her work as the recipient of the American Educational Research Association Social Justice Award, the Division K Teaching and Teacher Education Legacy Award, the CSU Monterey Bay President's Medal, the Chapman University Paulo Freire Education Project Social Justice Award, and the American Educational Research Association Special Interest Group Multicultural and Multiethnic Education Lifetime Achievement Award.

Personal background 

Christine E. Sleeter was born in 1948 in Oregon. In 1970, she graduated from Willamette University with a bachelor's degree in political science. In 1972, she attended Central Washington University, where she studied Secondary Education and earned a second bachelor's degree. In 1977, she earned a master's degree in Curriculum and Instruction from Seattle University. Teaching in Seattle, Washington prompted her initial interest in multicultural education and the position of Caucasian people in the field. Her work as a learning disabilities teacher formed a position about the construction of disability within social contexts. In 1981, she earned a Ph.D. in Curriculum and Instruction from the University of Wisconsin-Madison.

Professional background 

Sleeter was a faculty member in teacher education at Ripon College (Wisconsin) from 1982 to 1985. She joined the faculty of the University of Wisconsin-Parkside from 1985 to 1994, where she earned tenure and was promoted to full professor. In summer 1987, she served as a visiting professor at the University of Washington Seattle.

In 1995, Sleeter moved to California State University at Monterey Bay, while the school was in the process of being established. She served as a founding member of the faculty and professor of teacher education until 2003. , she continues to serve as the Professor Emerita in the School of Professional Studies, California State University, Monterey Bay.

In 2004, she began serving as the Vice President of Division K (Teaching and Teacher Education) of the American Educational Research Association, remaining in that position through 2007. In 2006, she served as a visiting professor at San Jose State University. During the summers of 1999 and 2007, she returned to University of Washington Seattle.

In the summers of 2006 and 2010, she was a visiting professor at the Victoria University of Wellington in New Zealand. During other visits to New Zealand between 2005 and 2009, she served as a member of an evaluation team on a large-scale study  through Victoria University of Wellington.

In 2009 and 2011, she served as a visiting professor at San Francisco State University. In 2011, she began serving a two-year term as the President of the National Association for Multicultural Education.

Honors and awards 
 2003: CSU Monterey Bay President's Medal
 2009: American Educational Research Association Social Justice Award
 2009: Division K Teaching and Teacher Education Legacy Award
 2012: Chapman University Paulo Freire Education Project Social Justice Award 
 2012: American Educational Research Association Special Interest Group Multicultural and Multiethnic Education Lifetime Achievement Award

Published works 
Sleeter has authored, edited, and co-edited 17 books and over 100 articles. She has collaborated with Carl Grant in conceptualizing approaches to multicultural education in the book, Making Choices for Multicultural Education, and has shown how those approaches relate to practice in the book, Turning on Learning. Her conceptualization of a process for designing multicultural curriculum continues to be used in the book Un-Standardizing Curriculum. She has researched teacher education and teacher professional development for multicultural education and culturally responsive pedagogy in her book, Confronting the marginalization of culturally responsive pedagogy, as well as in the book Professional Development for Culturally Responsive and Relationship-Based Pedagogy. Her foundational work conceptualizing learning disabilities as a social construction presents the field of disability studies. In 2010, she was commissioned by the National Education Association to review the research on the impact of ethnic studies on students, which supported work in ethnic studies.

Selected articles
 Sleeter, C. E. (2001). "Preparing teachers for culturally diverse schools: Research and the overwhelming presence of whiteness", Journal of Teacher Education 52(2): 94–106.
 Sleeter, C. E. (2008). "Preparing white teachers for diverse students", in M. Cochran-Smith, S. Feiman-Nemser, & J. McIntyre (Eds.), Handbook of Research in Teacher Education: Enduring Issues in Changing Contexts, 3rd ed., (pp. 559–582), New York: Routledge. 
 Sleeter, C. E. (2008). "Teaching for democracy in an age of corporatocracy", Teachers College Record 110 (1): 139–159.
 Sleeter, C. E. (2008). "Equity, democracy, and neoliberal assaults on teacher education", Teaching and Teacher Education 24 (8), 1947–1957.
 Sleeter, C. E. (2009). "Developing teacher epistemological sophistication about multicultural curriculum: A case study", Action in Teacher Education 31 (1), 3–13.
 Sleeter, C. E. (2010). "Building counter-theory about disability", Disability Studies Quarterly 30 (2)
 Sleeter, C. E. (2010). "Federal education policy and social justice education", in T. K. Chapman & N. Hobbel (Eds), Social Justice Pedagogy Across the Curriculum, (pp. 36–58). New York: Routledge.
 Sleeter, C. E.; and H.R. Milner, IV. (2011). "Researching successful efforts in teacher education to diversify teachers", in A. F. Ball C. A. Tyson, Eds. Studying Diversity in Teacher Education, (p. 81-104). New York, NY: Rowman & Littlefield.
 Sleeter, C. E. (2011). "Becoming white: Reinterpreting a family story by putting race back into the picture", Race Ethnicity & Education 14(3), 421–433.
 Sleeter, C. E. (2012). "Confronting the marginalization of culturally responsive pedagogy", Urban Education 47(3), 562–584.

Books

 Grant, C. A.; and C.E. Sleeter, (2007). Doing Multicultural Education for Achievement and Equity, New York: RoutledgeFalmer. 
 Sleeter, C. E., Ed. (2007). Facing Accountability in Education: Democracy and Equity at Risk, New York: Teachers College Press. 
 May, S.; and C.E. Sleeter, Eds. (2010). Critical Multiculturalism: Theory and Praxis, New York: Routledge. 
 Sleeter, C. E.; and C. Cornbleth, C., Eds. (2011). Teaching with Vision: Culturally Responsive Teaching in Standards-Based Classrooms, New York: Teachers College Press. 
 Sleeter, C. E.; and E. Soriano, E., Eds. (2012). Creating Solidarity across Diverse Communities: International Perspectives in Education, New York: Teachers College Press. 
 Sleeter, C. E.; Upadhyaya, S. B.; Mishra, A.; and S. Kumar, Eds. (2012). School Education, Pluralism and Marginality: Comparative Perspectives, Andhra Pradesh, India: Orient Black Swan. .

References

External links 
 https://web.archive.org/web/20101011083455/http://www.tolerance.org/tdsi/author/christine-sleeter
 http://christinesleeter.org/about-christine-sleeter/

1948 births
Living people
Educators from Oregon
Willamette University alumni
Central Washington University alumni
Seattle University alumni
University of Wisconsin–Madison School of Education alumni
California State University, Monterey Bay faculty
Ripon College (Wisconsin) faculty
University of Wisconsin–Parkside faculty
American women academics
21st-century American women